The Mix Tape Volume 1 (60 Minutes of Funk) is a mixtape by American DJ Funkmaster Flex, composed of freestyles and previously released songs, all mixed with Funk Flex's production. It was released on November 21, 1995 via Loud/RCA Records. Recording sessions took place at D&D Studios in New York.

The album was mildly successful on the Billboard charts, peaking at 108 on the Billboard 200 and 15 on the Top R&B/Hip-Hop Albums. It was followed up by three successful sequels, all of which were certified gold by the Recording Industry Association of America.

Track listing

Charts

References

External links

1995 debut albums
Loud Records albums
Funkmaster Flex albums
Hip hop compilation albums